Raees may refer to:
 Raees (1976 film), an Indian Hindi-language drama film
 Raees (2017 film), an Indian Hindi-language action film
 Raees (soundtrack), a soundtrack album from the film
 Rais, a title used by the rulers of Arab states in the Middle East and in South Asia
 Rumman Raees (born 1991), Pakistani cricketer